Johannes Hörner (born 10 August 1972) is a French-German economist and currently Alfred Cowles Professor of Economics at Yale University. His research focuses on microeconomics and game theory.

Education 
Hörner graduated from the HEC Paris with an M.Sc. in management in 1994. He went on to study at DELTA, a predecessor of the Paris School of Economics, and received an M.A. in economics in 1994. He then studied for a Ph.D. in economics at the University of Pennsylvania and graduated in 2000.

Career 
The Kellogg School of Management at Northwestern University appointed Hörner assistant professor of managerial economics upon graduation. In 2005, he was promoted to associate professor before leaving for a professorship at Yale University in 2008. In 2014, he was appointed Alfred Cowles Professor.

He was an associate editor of Econometrica and the Journal of Economic Theory. He serves as co-editor of Economic Theory and was co-editor of Theoretical Economics from 2010 to 2016.

In 2011, the Econometric Society elected him fellow.

References

External links 
 Official website
Profile on the website of Yale University

Living people
1972 births
German economists
French economists
HEC Paris alumni
University of Pennsylvania alumni
Kellogg School of Management faculty
Yale University alumni
Fellows of the Econometric Society